Soná is a corregimiento in Soná District, Veraguas Province, Panama with a population of 10,802 as of 2010. It is the seat of Soná District. Its population as of 1990 was 9,094; its population as of 2000 was 10,104.

References

Corregimientos of Veraguas Province